Pterophorus tinsuki is a moth of the family Pterophoridae. It is found in India.

References

Moths described in 2003
tinsuki
Moths of Asia